Normandy Thatched Cottage, Old Trouville is an oil painting by French artist Paul Huet. It is currently on display at the Musée du Louvre in Paris.

References

External links
 Description at the Musée du Louvre

Paintings by Paul Huet
Paintings in the Louvre by French artists
French paintings